Carson Cole Allen is an American singer-songwriter known for his roles in former bands: lead vocalist for On the Last Day and Me vs. Myself, tracemyveins keyboardist and founding member of Escape the Fate, as well as his current project Something Witchy, and his solo music.

Musical career

Early days and TraceMyVeins (2004–2005)
Carson attended Billings West High School and graduated in 2005. During his time there, he joined his first band at age 14. Since then he has been in numerous bands, playing different types of music. Before Escape the Fate formed, Carson Allen had started his own post-hardcore band titled "TraceMyVeins" after leaving previous band "Apathy Drowns Desire" after releasing the EP Farewell Edgewood. The band released two songs that were to be their singles titled "I Wish I Knew How to Quit You" and "This Is What You Get for Helping People?". After realizing the band wasn't getting anywhere, Allen decided to quit to join Escape the Fate.

Escape the Fate (2005–2006)
Before forming Escape the Fate, vocalist Ronnie Radke, bassist Max Green, drummer Robert Ortiz, lead guitarist Bryan "Monte" Money, Carson Allen, and rhythm guitarist Omar Espinosa were in multiple bands together. Monte Money later created Escape the Fate, and invited Omar Espinosa, who then invited Max Green into the band. Max Green later invited Ronnie Radke and Robert Ortiz, and later recruited Carson Allen.

In September 2005, the band had won a local radio contest judged by My Chemical Romance. The gig awarded them the opportunity to open a show on the band's headlining tour with Alkaline Trio and Reggie and the Full Effect, which subsequently led to Escape the Fate's record deal with Epitaph.

On May 23, 2006, the band released their debut EP titled There's No Sympathy for the Dead. The EP included two songs that were later on their full-length album, Dying Is Your Latest Fashion. The EP was produced by Michael Baskette and helped earn the band attention from record labels and fans alike. Prior to the EP's recording and subsequent release, Allen left the band to join "Devilyn Alaska" and then eventually On the Last Day.

On the Last Day (2007–2009)
Before joining on the Last Day, Allen had recorded some songs with Devilyn Alaska. When Geoff Walker was removed the band, On the Last Day, in May 2007, Allen had been announced as their new vocalist. On February 13, 2008, On the Last Day left their record label of Victory Records.On the Last Day then released their second EP called Make It Mean Something, which was released through Torque Records. The album charted at number 3 on the west coast Billboard Heatseekers chart.

On September 2, 2009, On the Last Day announced they were no longer together and were on an "indefinite hiatus".

Me vs. Myself (2009–present)
After the band announced their hiatus, Me vs. Myself was started in 2009 in Seattle by singer Carson Allen, along with Jaron Johnson, Nick Wiggins and formerly Frank Gross till he left the band in 2011. The four recorded their debut EP "Seasons", which was released February 2010.
After playing shows in Seattle, Me vs. Myself began playing shows along the west coast in June 2010. The following January, the band relocated to Los Angeles to work on what would be their Debut LP.
On November 29 the band released another EP titled Where I Am...Where I Want to Be, tracked in Buffalo, New York, at the studio owned by The Goo Goo Dolls. The track "Now and Then" was produced by Goo's bassist Robby Takac.

The band had split in 2012, playing their last show and then deleting their Facebook page with no reason given. They released a statement about the split three years later: 

- MVM

In early 2014, the band made a new page and announced they were getting back together. They released a demo for a new track they were working on called "If She Knew Better". On October 31, they announced their first reunion show, the band has been playing shows ever since then. The band eventually went on a short split to focus on other projects but reunited in 2015, announcing their first show for January 9.

Solo career/IN GOD WE RUST (2012–present)
On the April 12, 2012, Carson Allen released his new single "Believe". A few days later, on April 16, Carson Allen posted on his Facebook page that "It was only a month ago I decided I wanted to do a solo project. I started a page on here, and got to work, a month later, I have over 1000 fans on here, released my first single, and am in the process of booking my first show. Everything I do would be pointless without you amazing people!! There are some BIG things ahead. I'm pumped to have you along for the ride! – Carson". On the June 28, Carson released his solo debut titled "Something Beautiful".

Early 2013, Carson announced that he was in the middle of writing the follow-up release to "Something Beautiful". Soon after, he released the name of the upcoming record, "Blue Eyed Soul". Production for Blue Eyed Soul began on March 1, 2013.

On February 25, Allen announced that he will be releasing his solo music under the moniker IN GOD WE RUST, and that he has started a new record at Streetlight Audio in Denver, Colorado. "Keep It Cool" EP was released on April 15, 2016.

Something Witchy (2016–present)
After moving back to Seattle in 2016, Allen announced in December that he, former bandmate Nick Wiggins and wife Melody Mars had started a new project called Something Witchy. Followed by the release of tracks "Sweet Dreams" and "Free Lies".

On September 1, Something Witchy released the single "Feeler", and played their first show sold-out performance at Seattle's legendary venue BARBOZA the following week, with Carson announcing on stage that a music video for "Feeler" would soon follow (October 1).

On August 10, 2018, Something Witchy released their debut EP "BLUE SKY".

Discography
Apathy Drowns Desire
 Farewell Edgewood (2005)

TraceMyVeins
 Blood Bath And Beyond (2006)

Escape the Fate
 Escape the Fate (EP) (2005)
 There's No Sympathy for the Dead (2006)
 Dying Is Your Latest Fashion (2006)

On the Last Day
 Make It Mean Something (2008)

Me Vs. Myself
 Seasons (2010)
 Where I Am... Where I Want To Be (2012)

Solo / IN GOD WE RUST
 Something Beautiful (2012)
 Blue Eyed Soul (2013)
 Bad Attitude (2013)
 Keep It Cool EP (2016)

References

External links
 Devilyn Alaska, traceMYveins, On the Last Day, Escape the Fate on bandmine.com
 Devilyn Alaska on Last.fm
 Devilyn Alaska on gosong.net

Living people
American heavy metal singers
Escape the Fate members
American heavy metal keyboardists
Year of birth missing (living people)
21st-century American keyboardists
21st-century American singers
21st-century American male musicians